Salinispora pacifica is an obligate marine actinomycetes bacterium species in the genus Salinispora.

See also
 Salinispora tropica
 Salinispora arenicola

References

External links
Type strain of Salinispora pacifica at BacDive -  the Bacterial Diversity Metadatabase	

Micromonosporaceae
Marine microorganisms